West Footscray is an inner-city suburb in Melbourne, Victoria, Australia,  west of Melbourne's Central Business District, located within the City of Maribyrnong local government area.

History

West Footscray Post Office (listed in reference as Footscray West) opened on 15 April 1914.

Demographics
 The most common ancestries in West Footscray were English 16.2%, Australian 15.9%, Vietnamese 7.8%, Irish 6.7% and Scottish 5.2%.
 In West Footscray, 53.4% of people were born in Australia. The most common countries of birth were Vietnam 8.0%, India 5.9%, Italy 1.9%, China (excludes SARs and Taiwan) 1.8% and England 1.7%.
 51.7% of people only spoke English at home. Other languages spoken at home included Vietnamese 10.4%, Italian 3.2%, Greek 2.0%, Cantonese 1.8% and Telugu 1.6%.
 The most common responses for religion in West Footscray were Catholic 25.0%, No Religion 24.3%, Buddhism 8.4%, Anglican 6.1% and Islam 5.6%.

Medicine

 The Western General Hospital's grounds are located in Footscray although in an area many local residents consider to be West Footscray (Formerly Western General Hospital, Footscray Hospital).
 The hospital's Emergency and Triage entrances are located in Eleanor Street, Footscray.
 The Western Private Hospital is located adjacent to the Western Hospital, on the corner of Eleanor and Marion Streets.
 A large number of other private medical practices are also located on Eleanor Street and Stanlake Street.
 There are two Veterinary Practices located on Barkly Street. West Footscray Veterinary Clinic and VetCall.

Culture
 The Whitten Oval in West Footscray is the home training ground of the AFL team Western Bulldogs, and was their home ground before they moved to Marvel Stadium.
 Barkly Village is a section of Barkly Street in West Footscray that hosts many local and ethnic grocers, stores and shops. The area has a long history of multiculturalism and includes many stores owned and operated by Indian, Vietnamese, Chinese, Anglo, Thai and Italian Australians. There is a particularly large Indian grocery store, "Bharat Traders", located here as well as independent supermarket Sims, at the end of the "Barkly Village" section of the street. Also along this strip is the Melbourne Chinese Bible Church.
 Construction of the new West Footscray Community Centre has been completed. It incorporates a local library, replacing the former West Footscray Library on the same site. The site is a part of the "Barkly Village" strip.
 The suburb has its own #wefo hashtag on Twitter
 The Footscray YMCA is located on Barret Reserve, Essex Street. 10th Footscray Scout, open to all youth aged 6–26, share the reserve with the YMCA meeting in a their hall on Graham St.
 The 2nd Footscray Scout Group is located at Gaudion Reserve, Barkly Street. The group has a website and is open to youth aged 7 to 26 years. It is part of Kariwara District.
 Shorten Reserve on Essex Street is home of the Druids Cricket Club and the West Footscray Roosters, a local Australian Rules Football team.
 Johnson Reserve on Essex Street is home to a local Soccer team, and League games are regularly played on Sunday afternoons. The North Footscray Devils are also located there and North Footscray and West Footscray are usually locked in battle.
 The Women's Circus is based in West Footscray in the Drill Hall.
 Phat Quang Temple, a Vietnamese Buddhist temple, is located in the suburb.

Education

There are three kindergartens:
 Kingsville Kindergarten (Located in the southern part of the suburb, but in an area many residents consider to be part of Kingsville or Yarraville).
 Scots' Kindergarten.
 West Footscray Neighbourhood House.

There are two primary schools in the West Footscray area:
 Footscray West Primary School.
 St John's Primary School (Technically in Footscray, but in an area many residents consider to be a part of West Footscray, also a Catholic school).

There is also a Catholic School located in the area:
 Corpus Christi Catholic School (Again, located in the southern "Kingsville" part of the suburb).

The Western Scout centre is a training centre for the adult volunteers of Scouts Australia and one of six such sites in Melbourne. Their office in the new complex at 77 Ashley Street includes equipment donated by the Footscray Rotary Club.

Transport

The following bus routes that pass through West Footscray;
216 Caroline Springs – Brighton Beach via Deer Park West, Sunshine, Footscray, Melbourne, St Kilda Road, Prahran (every day). Operated by Kinetic Melbourne.
219 Sunshine Park – Gardenvale via Sunshine, Footscray, Melbourne, St Kilda Road, Prahran (every day). Operated by Kinetic Melbourne.
220 Sunshine – Gardenvale via Footscray, Melbourne, St Kilda Road, Prahran (every day). Operated by Kinetic Melbourne.
411 Footscray – Laverton via Geelong Road, Altona Gate SC, Altona, Altona Meadows (every day). Operated by CDC Melbourne.
412 Footscray – Laverton via Geelong Road, Altona Gate SC, Altona, Altona Meadows (every day). Operated by CDC Melbourne.
414 Footscray – Aircraft station via Geelong Road, Laverton North (Monday to Saturday). Operated by CDC Melbourne.

West Footscray has two railway stations; West Footscray and Tottenham. West Footscray was completely rebuilt and moved 200 metres west of the original station location as part of the Regional Rail Link, with the new station opening on 14 October 2013. As part of Metro Tunnel works, a third platform was built on the Cross Street side of the station to allow services to terminate. Work commenced in 2018 and was completed in 2020.

Sport

The suburb has two Australian Rules football clubs competing in the Western Region Football League, West Footscray Football Club and North Footscray Football Club. The Druids Cricket Club is also based in West Footscray, playing at Shorten Reserve.

The Footscray United Soccer Club plays at Hansen Reserve.

See also
 City of Footscray – West Footscray was previously within this former local government area.

References

External links
West Footscray Suburb Profile

Suburbs of Melbourne
Suburbs of the City of Maribyrnong